Steven Whyte (born 17 March 1969) is a sculptor classically trained in the traditional methodology of figurative bronze and portrait sculpture living in Carmel, California. He has produced many public memorials and installations in both England and throughout the United States with subjects ranging from miners, to soldiers and fire fighters.  He is credited with over fifty life size and larger bronze public figures and major monuments including The Silverdale Mining Memorial, The Lance Sergeant Jack Baskeyfield VC Tribute, The Spirit of 1948, and The Dr. John Roberts Monument.  Whyte's multimillion-dollar, sixteen-figure monument in San Diego, California entitled National Salute to Bob Hope and the Military is one of his most notable works.

In 2010, Whyte unveiled a twice life size portrait monument of the 1957 Heisman Trophy Winner, John David Crow at Texas A&M University in College Station, Texas and a life size full relief statue of St. Anthony and Child at Basilica of Mission San Carlos Borromeo de Carmelo (Carmel Mission) Carmel-by-the-Sea, CA.

Whyte's work also includes four life size figures for a memorial to the fallen officers of the San Diego Sheriff's Department which was unveiled in May 2011. He also completed a nine figure composition for Cannery Row, Monterey, CA, and a life size Jumbo the Elephant for Tufts University, MA. One of Whyte's most complex works, the massive statue for Texas A&M University titled The Aggie War Hymn Monument, has twelve 1.6 times life size bronze figures of students, "sawing off variety's horns". The 10 ft by 39 ft sculpture was unveiled in September 2014, at a cost of $1.7M.  In 2016 Whyte was awarded Sports Artist of the Year, sculptor, by The United States Sports Academy and The American Sport Art Museum & Archives. In December 2016 The Smithsonian Institution acquired Whyte's bronze bust of Congressman John Conyers Jr. for the National Portrait Gallery (United States) in Washington D.C..

Whyte was the sculptor for the Column of Strength, San Francisco's controversial Comfort Women Memorial.

Biography 
The son of Campbell MacNaughton Whyte (retired Royal Air Force) and Janice Whyte (Homemaker, Gardener and Artisan), Steven Whyte was born 17 March 1969 in Amesbury, United Kingdom and grew up in various parts of Europe including Scotland, Germany, the Netherlands, England, and the Shetland Isles.

Whyte, a dyslexic, has been described as first using art as a social solution, rather than a potential vocation: "Art class was often the only place I felt confident that I could contribute and learn at the same rate as my peers.”  Whyte's first art courses were drawing and graphic design, but it was not until high school that he began learning ceramics and sculpture.  As an undergraduate, he was granted a full scholarship and became the youngest applicant accepted to the Sir Henry Doulton School of Sculpture, under the late Professor Colin Melbourne ARCA and Dame Elisabeth Frink RA.

After leaving school, Whyte co-wrote the only validated figurative sculpture course in England and accepted a teaching position at Stafford College. He then became the youngest member of the London-based Society of Portrait Sculptors, where he served as Vice-President alongside President Franta Belsky PPRBS, late sculptor to the Royal Family.  Whyte's early career consisted primarily of private commissions and portrait work, with over 70 completed commissioned official portraits to date.

In 2003, Whyte opened his first US open studio and gallery on Cannery Row in Monterey, California.  In 2007, the Steven Whyte Sculpture Studio and Gallery moved to Carmel-by-the-Sea, California where it is currently open to the public every day.

Artistic style 
The human form is Whyte's preferred subject, and he typically works with live models whenever possible. His sculptures are ultimately cast in bronze, but they begin as clay.

Steven Whyte describes himself as a "sculptor of people" and although his pieces are reminiscent of classical figures, Whyte chooses to put importance on "the emotional quality and impact of the sculpture" more than the adherence to traditional technique.  Whyte intends for his work to have "narrative and tangible personality".

Whyte currently works in a studio that is open to the public.  The interaction and response has become a part of his work.  “There's a constant energy. It's like when a film actor does theater and suddenly there's no distance between his work and the audience, the response is both immediate and honest.”

Public collections 
Museums:

Smithsonian National Portrait Gallery, Washington D.C.

The House of Commons, London

National Portrait Gallery, London

National Marine Corp Museum, VA

The Carter Center, GA

Municipalities:

San Diego Port Authority, CA

City of Stoke-on-Trent, UK

City of Fontana, CA

City of Seaside, CA

City of Monterey, CA

City of Hollywood, FL

City of Seoul, South Korea

City of Dublin, CA

The State of Florida

Educational Institutions:

Texas A&M University

Tufts University

Houston Baptist University

Furman University

Public commissions

•	The State of Florida's Slavery Memorial Monument.  Multiple over-life-sized bronze figures representing the history of slavery of African American history.  The Florida State Capitol Building, Tallahassee, FL.  2023

•	Michael Marotta Memorial.  Life-size seated figure of "Mr. Monterey" for Monterey, CA. 2021

•	Joseph Vaughn.  Life-size standing bronze sculpture of Joseph Vaughn, the first African-American student at Furman University for Furman University in Greenville, SC. 2020

•	President Jimmy Carter. Three times life-size bust of President Carter for Carter Center, Presidential Library. Atlanta, GA. 2019.

•	Chief Justice Earl Warren. Three-times life-size portrait bust on 15 ft sculpted column. California Memorial Masonic Temple. San Francisco, CA. 2019.

•	Comfort Women's Circle of Strength. Four life-size figures of WWII Comfort Women, interactive and inclusive of today's movements for the protection of women. Seoul, South Korea. 2019.

•	Don Biddle Memorial. Life-size bust of Councilman Don Biddle for Don Biddle Community Park. Dublin, CA. 2019.

•	Dublin Veterans Memorial. Four 1.5 times life-size military figures and plaza. Crossing Park, Dublin, CA. 2019.

•	General Benjamin O. Davis, Jr. A life-size figure of United States Air Force general and commander of the WWII Tuskegee Airmen. United States Military Academy at West Point. 2018.

•	Congressman John J. Conyers, Jr. Life size bust of the U.S. representative for Michigan's 13th congressional district. Member of Congress since 1965 and is currently its dean. Washington D.C. 2017.

•	Jumbo the Elephant.  Life-size (11 ft) African elephant monument for Tufts University's mascot.  Tufts University, Medford, MA. 2014.

•	Aggie War Hymn Monument.  Twelve 1.6 times life-size figures on a 40' x 4' base. Representing Aggie students standing side-by-side during a traditional “sawing off Varsity's horns” cheer.  Texas A&M University, College Station, TX, 2014.

•	A National Monument to John Steinbeck and Cannery Row.  Nine slightly over life-size figures on a 17' x 20' x 16' stone formation.  Author John Steinbeck and eight characters from his novel Cannery Row.  Cannery Row, Monterey, CA. 2014.

•	Senator William T. Moore.  Life size half figure bust of Senator Moore for Texas A&M University.  Texas A&M University, College Station, TX. 2013.

•	Tribute to Fallen Deputies.  Four life-size figures in tribute to fallen officers and their families.  San Diego Sheriffs Deputies Association, San Diego, CA. 2011.

•	John David Crow.  Twice life -size portrait action figure of 1957 Heisman Trophy Winner John David Crow for Texas A&M. Texas A&M University, College Station, TX. 2010.

•	St. Anthony of Padua.  Life-size full depth relief of St. Anthony and Child.  Carmel Mission San Carlos Borromeo, Carmel, CA. 2009.

•	Dream Speech Bust.  1.5 times life-size portrait bust of Dr. Martin Luther King, Jr. displayed above a plaque containing his “I Have a Dream” speech in its entirety. City of Hollywood, FL. 2008.

•	Column of Knowledge.  1.5 times life-size portrait bust of Dr. Martin Luther King, Jr. perched on a stack of books that had influenced his life and work. City of Fontana, CA. 2008.

•	A National Tribute to Bob Hope and the Military.  Eight life-size figures representing various eras of service men, women and veterans.  San Diego Port Authority, San Diego, CA. 2008.

•	Dr. John L. D. Roberts Monument.  Life size statue of the founder of Seaside, California.  Citizens Committee, City of Seaside, CA. 2004.

•	David and Lucile Packard Relief and chairs the Board of the Monterey Bay Aquarium. Relief Portrait plaque, 16” x 16”, bronze. Monterey Bay Aquarium, Monterey, California. 2003.

•	Spirit of 1948.  Three life-size figures in cast stone as a tribute to the Staffordshire Fire Service.  Staffordshire, England. 1998.

•	Holden Lane High School Relief.  Project with local high school to create 21' x 7' brick relief.  Burslem, England. 1998.

•	Mier Portal.  36' x 14' brick relief for interstate tunnel portal.  Mier, England. 1997.

•	The Lance Sergeant Jack Baskeyfield VC Tribute. Twice life size (12 ft) full memorial figure of the Victoria Cross winner, and the only monument to a non-commissioned soldier in Britain. Hanley, England. 1996.

•	The Silverdale Mining Memorial.  1.5 times life-size miner, pushing mining tub with eleven bronze plaques including four life size portrait reliefs. Newcastle-under-Lyme, England. 1996.

•	Tribute to Reginald Mitchell.  1.25 times life-size full memorial figure to the aeronautical designer of the Spitfire aircraft. Staffordshire, England. 1991

•	Destiny.  Queen's Moat Hotel Group.  Staffordshire, England. 1991.

•	Bust of May Walley.  Victoria Hall, Hanley.  Staffordshire, England. 1990.

Religious Work

•	Five Saints. Five half life-size figures sculpted for niches in the Cloisters on the Platte chapel. Omaha, NE. 2019.

•	Stewart Morris, Sr. A life-size figure of one of Houston Baptist University's founding fathers. Houston Baptist University, Houston, TX. 2017.

•	Saint Mary and Saint Joseph. Life-size figures of Mary and Joseph. Cloisters on the Platte, Omaha, NE. 2018.

•	Mary and Joseph. 7 ft figure of Mary and 8 ft figure of Joseph. Cloisters on the Platte, Omaha, NE. 2018.

Titled Portrait Works from life

UK Busts and Figures 1989-2000

Shami Ahmad 			- Chairman, Pinwise PLC

Lord Alexander 			- Chairman, National Westminster Bank PLC

Heather Angel RSP 		- Photographer, author

Viscount Blakenham 		- Chairman, Pearson PLC

James Bowman 			- Counter Tenor, English National Opera

Arthur Chollerton CBE 		- Chairman, Staffordshire County Council

Mrs. Hilda Clarke			- Director, St. Modwen PLC

Sir Stanley W. Clarke		- Chairman, St. Modwen PLC

The Rt. Hon. Kenneth Clarke M.P. 	- Chancellor of the Exchequer

Peter Cropper 			- Leader, The Lindsey String Quartet

Peter Cheeseman 		- Director, The New Victoria Theatre, Newcastle-under-Lyme

Counsellor Alan Edwards 		- Lord Mayor of Stoke-on-Trent

Professor Brian Fender CMG 	- Vice-Chancellor, Keele University

Mark Fisher MP 			- Junior Minister of the Arts

Lord Forte 			- President, Forte PLC

Richard Giordano KBE 		- Chairman, British Gas PLC

Sir John Harvey-Jones 		- Industrialist, author, Retired chairman ICI PLC

Edgar Haber			- President, Quail Lodge Resort, Carmel, CA

Dr. James Heron MB FRCP 	- Chairman, The Institute of Neurologists

Freddie Jones 			- Actor RSC

Dr. Stephen Lock 		- Editor, The British Medical Journal

Patrick Moore OBE 		- Astronomer, author

Jackie Mudie 			- Scottish International Soccer Player

Lord Palumbo 			- Chairman, The Arts Council of Great Britain

Rupert Pennent-Rea 		- Deputy chairman, The Bank of England

Trevor Pinnock ARMC 		- Director, The English Concert Orchestra

Sir Evelyn de Rothschild 		- Chairman, Rothschild Bank

John Rudge 			- Manager, Port Vale Football Club

Sir Colin Southgate 		- Chairman, Thorne EMI PLC

The Earl of Stockton 		- President, Macmillan Publishers Ltd

Neal Smith			- CEO, The Golf Group Inc.

Lord Sterling 			- Chairman, P&O PLC

The Rt. Rev. Keith Sutton 		- Lord Bishop of Litchfield

Lord Tombs			- Retired chairman, Rolls-Royce Aero PLC

May Walley MBE 			- Director, The Bedford Singers

Lord Weathrill MP 		- Speaker, The House of Commons

The Duke of Westminster 		- President, Grosvenor International Holdings

Lord Young 			- Chairman, Cable and Wireless PLC

USA Busts and Figures 1989-2000

Ted Balestreri  			- Chairman & CEO, Cannery Row Company

Mike Beasley 			- Venture Partner of Nobska Ventures. Chairman, Rocket Software

Congressman John J Conyers 	- US Representative, Dean of the House of Representatives

Herman "Herm" Edwards Jr. 	- American football analyst for ESPN and former NFL player and coach

Gustavo M. de la Garza Ortega	- Founder and chairman, Marcatel Com

Edgar H. Haber 			- Founder of Quail Lodge Resort and Golf Club

Secretary Leon Panetta		- Director, CIA. US Secretary of Defense

Sylvia Panetta		- Director, Panetta Institute

Sam Linder			- President, Sam Linder Auto Group

Burt Mendlesohn 			- Consultant

George Tanimura			- Co-founder, Tanimura & Antle

Achievements 
 1987:  Recipient fellowship to attend the Sir Henry Doulton School of Sculpture
 1994–2002:  Member, The Society of Portrait Sculptors
 1994–1996:  Vice-President, The Society of Portrait Sculptors
 1997–present:  Associate, National Association for the Prosecution of Felons (Burslem)
 2002–2004:  Invited in 2002-2004 to guest lecture at The National Portrait Gallery, London
 2005-2007:  Voted "Best Artist" in Monterey County by the readers of Monterey County Weekly
 2008-2009:  Voted "Best Sculpture Gallery" in Monterey County by the readers of Carmel Pine Cone
 2009:  Voted "Best Sculpture Gallery" in Monterey County by the readers of Monterey County Weekly
 2009-2016:  Voted "Best Artist" in Monterey County by the readers of Carmel Pine Cone
 2016 Awarded Sports Artist of the Year, sculptor, by The United States Academy of Sports and The American Sport Art Museum & Archives. 
 2016 Smithsonian Institution acquire Whyte's bronze bust of Congressman John J. Conyers Jr. for the National Portrait Gallery in Washington D.C..
2019 Work acquired by the Jimmy Carter Presidential Library, GA
2021 Winner of National Sculpture Society's, Stanley Bleifeld Memorial Award

See also 
 List of sculptors

Notes

References

Further reading

External links 

 Steven Whyte's Sculpture Studios and Gallery
 Steven Whyte's Sculpture Studio Blog
 National Salute to Bob Hope and the Military Sculptures by Eugene L. Daub & Steven Whyte
 http://www.carmelartfestival.org/    (click "Steven Whyte 2009" on the left hand side of the webpage)
 City of Hollywood to Unveil the Dr. Martin Luther King, Jr. Multicultural Art Project Press Release
 Online pages on Steven Whyte from the book, Public Sculpture of Staffordshire and Black Country

1969 births
20th-century British sculptors
21st-century American sculptors
21st-century American male artists
21st-century British sculptors
American male sculptors
English emigrants to the United States
English male sculptors
English sculptors
People from Amesbury
People from Carmel-by-the-Sea, California
Living people
Sculptors from California